The Rio do Peixe is a river of São Paulo and Minas Gerais states in southeastern Brazil. It is a tributary of the Mojiguaçu River.

See also
List of rivers of Minas Gerais
List of rivers of São Paulo

References
Brazilian Ministry of Transport

Rivers of São Paulo (state)